KRFC  is a community-based radio station located in Fort Collins, Colorado, USA.

KRFC may also refer to any of the following sports clubs:

Kalamazoo Rugby Football Club
Keadue Rovers F.C.
Kenilworth RFC
Kettering Rugby Football Club
Kilsyth Rangers F.C.
Kilwinning Rangers F.C.
King's College Rugby Club
Kintbury Rangers F.C.
Kirkcaldy RFC

See also

KRUFC (disambiguation)